Geleznowia is a monotypic genus of a flowering plant in the family Rutaceae.  It is a small shrub with oval-shaped leaves, yellow flowers and is endemic to Western Australia.  Its only species is Geleznowia verrucosa.

Description
Flowering occurs in July to October.

Taxonomy and naming
Geleznowia verrucosa was first formally described in 1849 by Ukrainian-Russian botanist Nicolai Stepanovitch Turczaninow and the description was published in Bulletin de la Société Impériale des Naturalistes de Moscou. The specific epithet (verrucosa) means "covered with warts".

Distribution and habitat
This species grows on sand plains and gravelly soils  in south-eastern Western Australia north of Perth.

References

External links

Flora of Western Australia
Taxa named by Nikolai Turczaninow
Zanthoxyloideae
Zanthoxyloideae genera